This is the list of notable stars in the constellation of Cygnus, sorted by decreasing apparent magnitude.

See also
List of stars by constellation

References

List
Cygnus